Markeith LeRoy Price (born May 19, 1990) is a visually impaired Paralympic athlete raised in Baltimore, Maryland in the United States competing in T13 (track) and F13 (field) events for the United States.

He reached the finals in the 400 m and long jump at the 2012 Summer Paralympic Games. He also competed in the 2013 IPC Athletics World Championships in Lyon, France, where he won a silver medal in the  relay. His relay team set a new national record with a time of 43.62.

Education
For high school Markeith attended Mount St. Joseph College in Baltimore, Maryland, graduating in 2008. He went on to attend Tennessee State University (TSU) where he was a track and field athlete. Markeith graduated from TSU in 2012 with a degree in fashion merchandise.

Family
Markeith is the son of Keith and Marcella Price. He is also the brother of Octavia M. Price. His parents raised him in the Christian church and to be a respectable adult.

I C You Foundation, Inc.
Markeith is founder and president of I C You Foundation. Their mission is "We are called and committed to service the needs of visually impaired students. To give back to the community by providing scholarships to students who are visually impaired/blind."

Major accomplishments
 2015: Parapan American Games – 4th in 100 m and long jump
 2015: Desert Challenge Games Gold Medalist – 100 m, 400 m Tempe, Arizona
 2014: U.S. Paralympic Track and Field National Championships Gold Medalist – 400m, San Mateo, California
 2013: IPC Athletics World Championships Silver Medalist –  relay, Lyon, France
 2013: IPC Athletics World Championships Sixth Place – Long Jump, Lyon, France
 2013: U.S. Paralympic Track and Field National Championships Gold Medalist – 400 m, San Antonio, Texas
 2012: U.S. Paralympic Track and Field National Championships Gold Medalist – 400 m, Indianapolis, Indiana
 2011: IPC Athletics World Championships Fourth Place – 200 m dash, Christchurch, New Zealand
 2011: Parapan American Games Bronze Medalist – 200 m dash, Guadalajara, Mexico
 2011: Parapan American Games Bronze Medalist – Long jump, Guadalajara, Mexico
 2011: U.S. Paralympic Track and Field National Championships Gold Medalist – 400m, Miramar, Florida
 2010: U.S. Paralympic Track and Field National Championships Gold Medalist – 400 m, Miramar, Florida
 2009: U.S. Paralympic Track and Field National Championships Gold Medalist – 400 m, Miramar, Florida
 2007: IBSA World Championships Silver Medalist – Triple jump, Sao Paulo, Brazil

Records
Price currently holds the United States Association of Blind Athletes records in the 200 m, 400 m, 800 m and long jump.

Awards 
In August 2017, Price received the Athletes in Excellence Award from The Foundation for Global Sports Development in recognition of his community service efforts and work with youth.

References

Living people
1990 births
Paralympic track and field athletes of the United States
Athletes (track and field) at the 2012 Summer Paralympics
World record holders in Paralympic athletics
American male sprinters
Tennessee State University alumni
Track and field athletes from Baltimore
Medalists at the 2011 Parapan American Games
Medalists at the World Para Athletics Championships
Tennessee State Tigers athletes